The 2005–06 Purdue Boilermakers men's basketball team represented Purdue University during the 2005-06 NCAA Division I men's basketball season. Matt Painter, the current head coach, began his first year at Purdue. On February 11 the Boilermakers upset #22 Michigan at Mackey Arena, which was their first win over a ranked team since beating #19 Wisconsin in January 2004. Purdue finished 9–19 overall and 3–15 in the Big Ten. Although they finished in last place in the Big Ten, they had improved on their overall record from the previous year by two games. The Boilermakers would win at least 16 games per season in all of their following seasons.

Schedule

References

Purdue
Purdue Boilermakers men's basketball seasons
Purd
Purd